Mahuli Nankar is a village in the Jale CD Block of Darbhanga district, in Bihar, India.

According to the 2011 census, the population in 2011 was 3149, comprising 599 families. These consisted of 1648 males and 1501 females. The literacy rate was reported as 85.4

Notes

Villages in Darbhanga district